The following is a list of ambassadors of the United States, or other chiefs of mission, to Brazil. The title given by the United States State Department to this position is currently Ambassador Extraordinary and Minister Plenipotentiary.

List

See also
Brazilian Ambassador to the United States
Embassy of Brazil, Washington, D.C.
Brazil – United States relations
Foreign relations of Brazil
Ambassadors of the United States

References

United States Department of State: Background notes on Brazil

External links
 United States Department of State: Chiefs of Mission for Brazil
 United States Department of State: Brazil
 United States Embassy in Brazil

Brazil
 
United States